Zhuang Ji had the courtesy name (zi) of Fuzi (夫子), literally, "the Master"; and, he was later sometimes referred to as Yan Ji (嚴忌) due to a naming taboo based on the  personal name of an emperor titled (Han Mingdi (personally named Liu Zhuang)). Zhuang Ji flourished in the second century BCE as an early Han dynasty writer of literature and court attendant. He is notable for being one of the most published poets ever, due to having authored the piece "Ai shi ming", or "Alas That My Lot Was Not Cast", collected in the repeatedly re-published Chuci collection of verse: although just because Zhuang Ji's work was prolifically published as being included in a popular and early anthology does not necessarily mean that he has been notable for his poetic excellence. None of his other works are known to have survived. Zhuang Ji's biography is also sparse, although he is known to have been born in Wu state and later found refuge in Liang state. Both Wu and Liang were then semi-independent states, regions of the Han dynasty, directly controlled by their local ruler, in these two cases members of the royal house of Han. Zhuang Ji pursued a literary career, from which he attained his fame, though he seems to have at least initially made a living attending his local ruler's court, though in what function is unknown. During Zhuang Ji's life, political turmoil and social upheaval greatly informed his contributions to literature, indeed this kind of state of affairs is very evident in "Ai shi ming". THEREFORE Zhuang Ji aspired to eventually join the central imperial court of Han to further his career or literary pursuits is unknown; however, it is known that he found patronage in two different regional state courts, in his native Wu, and later in Liang, then a center of literary activity. Zhuang Ji experienced turbulent and dangerous events which happened to occur in the places in which he dwelt, yet still found time and energy for a literary calling.

Biography
Little is known about the life of Zhuang Ji. However, there are historical records from the time which indicate the environmental background of his times. This was during the early Han dynasty, which was divided up into semi-autonomous states ruled by princes of the Liu family, the royal dynasts of Han. His two main patrons were both princes of the Liu dynastic family, and rulers of semi-autonomous states (under nominal loyalty to the emperor -- vassal states of the early Han); and, both of his patrons ended up on the bad side of their relative, the Han emperor of the time, who was consolidating his imperial authority. Zhuang Ji's first patron was Liu Pi, who reigned as King/Prince of Wu from 216 to 154 BCE. Wu (吳) was Zhuang Ji's home state.  Zhuang Zhu, a son or nephew of Zhuang Ji, became a courtier to the emperor Han Wudi, initially chosen by tested merit through the imperial examination system, and later becoming personally  promoted by Wudi to be Palace Grandee (zhong dafu), Zhuang Zhu became one of Wu's favorite courtiers.

Early life
Zhuang Ji was a native of Wu, now southern Jiangsu, born in Kuaiji Commandery. Wu had formerly been part of the Warring States kingdom of Chu, for which the Chuci poetry anthology was named, and largely inspired by.

At the court of Liu Pi, prince of Wu

Zhuang Ji eventually served at the court of Liu Pi, Prince of Wu (reigned 195 BCE - 154 BCE). He served there with his two friends Zou Yang and Mei Sheng. They presumably found some use for their literary skills, or perhaps they served as advisors of some sort; however, Zhuang Ji's patron in Wu, Liu Pi, has shown to history little interest in literature, and left no surviving works, in contrast with his second patron in Liang, who had quite the literary scene going on at his court.

The beginning of troubles

Emperor Han Wendi was the father by his wife Wang Zhi to Liu Pi and to crown prince, heir apparent to the empire. According to Sima Qian, prince Pi's son Liu Xian and his brother crown prince Qi became involved in a game of liubo "chess", which ended in the crown prince killing his nephew, Liu Pi's son, with the game board (which were often made of stone or bronze). Wendi died in 157 BCE and Qi became the emperor now known as Han Jingdi. Out of revenge and growing distrust of his brother, the emperor, Pi started building up wealth and military strength in Wu state. Jingdi then fell under the influence of his warmongering, trouble-making, and unwavering advocate of the Legalist school of thought minister Chao Cuo. This was followed by an imperial campaign to at least reduce the strength if not eliminate the semi-independent regional princes of Wu, Liang, Chu, and so on, thus to consolidate power in the central imperium. Perceiving the threat, and already so inclined due to the emperor (as crown prince) having killed his son, in 154 BCE prince Pi convinced six other ruling princes of the royal blood to rebel against the Han emperor; however, some of the rulers  such as Liu Wu of Liang remained loyal vassals to Jingdi. This was the beginning of what is known as the Rebellion of the Seven States, or the Vassals' Rebellion.

Later life
Zhuang Ji would go on to develop his literary career at the patronage of the Han emperor's younger brother, the literally-inclined Liu Wu, ruler of Liang. He would thus avoid the disaster which would soon befall his former patron, as a result of his rebellious actions. However, danger affected Liang also, as it ended up as target of attack by Liu Pi and allies.

At the court of Liu Wu, prince of Liang

Zhuang, Zou, and Mei seem to have taken the opportunity to leave Wu at some point during the process of the developing troubles, perhaps in 157 BCE, before things got too perilous, and actual warfare broke out. Furthermore, Zhuang Ji's companions Zou Yang and Mei Cheng had memorialized Liu Pi advising him to not revolt against the Han emperor, advice which was rejected. The three went to Liang, where they obtained the patronage of Liu Wu, Prince of Liang, the Han emperor's younger brother, and a great patron of the literary arts.

Princes' Rebellion

in 154 BCE, under the influence of minister Chao Cuo, who came up with many excuses or reasons for doing so, emperor Jingdi ordered punishing reduction of many of the states, including carving out the commanderies (areas directly under imperial control) of Huiji and Yuzhang from the state territory of Wu, Zhuang Ji's home state. Jingdi lost his enthusiasm for his trouble-making minister Chao Cuo, after his minister Yuan Ang persuaded the emperor that Chao Cuo's claims of the vassal princes' disloyalty was overstated. Jing had minister Chao Cuo executed. However, events had already been set in motion.

Uprising
The seven rebel dynast princes then rose in armed rebellion, with the support of allied southern independent kingdoms of Donghai (modern Zhejiang) and Minyue (modern Fujian), which sent troops in aid. This was known as the Rebellion of the Seven States or the Vassals' War. Allied princes including Zhuang Ji's former patron Liu Pi. After some dispute between them as to the proper course of action, some, including Liu Pi, and the ruler of the state of Chu, decided to attack the state of Liang, ruled by emperor Jingdi's vassal, his younger brother, Zhuang Ji's new patron Liu Wu, Prince of Liang (劉武/刘武 of 梁). The rebel armies particularly those of Wu and Chu besieged Liu Wu's capital Suiyang (睢陽). Presumably both patron and client were at court to suffer through the siege.

Response
The empress dowager Xiaowen urged her son the emperor to send the imperial army to relieve Liang and her younger son, where presumably Zhuang Ji was located at the time at the prince's court, along with his two friends. The emperor appointed Zhou Yafu as general commander. General Zhou was a highly disciplined and effective general. After taking up his command, Zhou Yafu took advantage of the disorder among the rebel princes to establish a strong camp at Xiayi (modern Dangshan in Anhui) athwart the rebel's line of supply and communication along the Si River, formerly a large and important watercourse. Ignoring Liu Wu's pleas for help and imperial orders to advance to the city, general Zhou used his discretion as field commander to refuse the orders and instead concentrate his resources at his base in Xiayi, where he made defenses, meanwhile disrupting the rebel supply lines from Chu, by sending the  Marquess of Gonggao, Han Tuidang, who was the son of Han Xin (韓王), someone who had spent quite a bit of time learning the mobile military techniques of the Xiongnu. The rebels meanwhile continued their unsuccessful assault on Zhuang Ji's new home in the capital of Liang Suiyang. With their supply lines cut by general Zhou's subordinate Han Tuidang's efficient cavalry, the rebels  fell back from their attack on Liang, deciding to attack general Zhou, at his by then well-fortified defensive base in Xiayi. In the event, the vassal prince's were easily defeated due to general Zhou's disciplined and effective preparations; indeed, Zhou initially refused even to be woken out of bed, upon the attack. The rebellion soon came to an end, after a fierce three months of fighting, with the defeat of the rebels.

Aftermath

The rebel princes generally came to a bad end: Zhuang Ji's former patron Liu Pi, ruler of Wu fled and was killed in flight by native Yue (a term used for various non-Han Chinese peoples), which people his duty had been to suppress, and his territory of Wu divided up among Liu Wu's sons. In contrast Zhuang Ji's patron Liu Wu was rewarded for his loyal support through the rebellion, his brother emperor Jingdi giving him honors and privileges. Liu Wu's private gardens rivaled the emperor's and he increased the number of his retinue, bringing in people whose actions would end up losing the favor he had gained with the emperor and leading to his eventual fall from grace. When Jingdi demoted his son Liu Rong from crown prince (taizi,  heir apparent), in 150 BCE, Liu Wu and Jingdi's mutual mother, empress dowager Dou took this opportunity to lobby for her son Jingdi to name her other son, Liu Wu, as crown prince and successor, rather than Jingdi promoting one of his sons to this position. Jingdi agreed initially, but was then talked out of it by advisors. For example, minister Yuan Ang warned strongly against this breaking of the laws of succession as a destabilizing precedent, appointing a brother rather than the usual practice of choosing a son. Proceeding in support of their patron, some of Liu Wu's new retainers then went out and murdered this minister, Yuan Ang, going on to commit a series of killings in the effort to regain their patron, Liu Wu's, position as crown prince and the opportunity to become emperor, if Jingdi were to suddenly die. When Jingdi found out about this intrigue, Liu Wu had his two retainers commit suicide, presenting their bodies to the emperor, in appeasement. Nevertheless, Liu Wu failed to regain favor after this, he was seldom received at court, and his half-nephew (the future emperor, Han Wudi) replaced him as crown prince. In another and related dangerous turn of events for Liu Wu, the new crown prince's mother Wang Zhi was promoted to first lady, consolidating power against him at court. However, Liu Wu did not loose support of all the powerful court females. His mother, empress dowager Dou, still supported him, refusing to eat until he was cleared of charges. After an official investigation, the report back to emperor Jingdi was that Liu Wu had been found to have been involved, that "sparing the Prince of Liang would break the law of Han", yet, "killing him would deeply distress the Empress Dowager and upset the Emperor even more", counseling Jingdi to drop the issue. In discussion with the women, he blamed the murders solely upon Liu Wu's two courtiers, now  dead and already lawfully punished. After returning from an unsuccessful trip to Chang'an, Liu Wu died at home in Liang, in 144 BCE.

Literary patronage
Liu Wu, prince of Liang, became a famous patron, particularly notably of the fu author Sima Xiangru. More generally, his court was a center of the development of fu poetry/prose style, rivaling that of his brother Jingdi, in Chang'an. Zhuang Ji was able to continue his literary efforts. His companion Zou Yang had one particularly influential piece was the "Memorial from Prison to the Prince of Liang", whereby Zou Yang successfully pleaded his case against the slander of other courtiers and freed himself from a death sentence not by addressing the charges against him but by multiplying historical examples of the disaster of gossip and libel. Zhuang Ji and Mei Sheng were said to have been too frightened to protest Zou's arrest and consequent narrowly-avoided death sentence. Liu Wu's death was at about age forty, at which time he still retained his court in Liang, and the feudal possessions thereof, despite being out-of-favor with the emperor. Prince Liu Wu of Liang left behind an estate estimated to include 400,000 catties of gold and an equivalent amount of wealth in land. It is not known whether Zhuang Ji outlived his patron.

Works

Zhuang Ji is known as the writer of the Chuci anthology piece "Ai shi ming", or "Alas That My Lot Was Not Cast". "Alas That My Lot Was Not Cast" is one of the poems anthologized in the ancient Chinese poetry collection, the Chu ci; which, together with the Shijing comprise the two major textual sources for ancient Chinese poetry. "Alas That My Lot Was Not Cast" is an example of the Sao type of Chu ci poetry, in the "O tempora o mores!" vein. "Ai shi ming" is written in the sao style initiated by Qu Yuan in his "Li sao", Zhuang Ji is also credited with writing 24 pieces in the fu-style by the Book of Han. Despite the mention of 24 fu in Hanshu, the only known surviving piece of Zhuang Ji is "Ai shi ming". Critical reception for Zhuang Ji's "Ai shi ming" has often been less than enthusiastic, despite his contemporaries nicknaming him "the Master", and even going so far as to extensively recycle parts of it as their own work. David Hawkes says that the poem incorporates all of the elements of the sao style: introspective grief, the symbolic structure, parallelism as a poetic device, and even a very brief shamanic-style spirit journey. However Hawkes finds the "inspiration dead" and the effect "monotonous and oppressive". Another point which he notes is to oppose the modern take on the poem to that of Zhuang Ji's contemporaries, whose taste for the poem was enhanced by their ability to particularly identify the "objects of his scorn and hatred", which is no longer possible due to lack of detailed information surviving into modern times. David Knechtes and Taiping Chan find that for the time in which it was written "Ai shi ming" has "eremitic sentiments" which were "rare in early Han" and that almost seem to be looking forward to Six Dynasties poetry.

See also
Alas That My Lot Was Not Cast
Chuci
Empress Wang Zhi
Empress Dou (Wen)
Han dynasty
Liu Pengli
Sima Xiangru

Notes

References
Hawkes, David, translation, introduction, and notes (2011 [1985]). Qu Yuan et al., The Songs of the South: An Ancient Chinese Anthology of Poems by Qu Yuan and Other Poets. London: Penguin Books. 
Chan, Alan K. L., Yuet-Keung Lo, editors, Interpretation and Literature in Early Medieval China, retrieved from Google Books 14 October 2018 
Paludan, Ann (1998). Chronicle of the Chinese Emperors: The Reign-by-Reign Record of the Rulers of Imperial China. New York, New York: Thames and Hudson. 

Chinese classic texts
Chinese poetry collections
Han dynasty writers
Rebellions in the Han dynasty
Prince of Liang
Han dynasty imperial princes